

History 
National Engineering College (NEC), Kovilpatti, Tamil Nadu, a self-financing autonomous institution affiliated to Anna University, Chennai, Tamil Nadu, was established in 1984 by Kalvithanthai Thiru.K.Ramasamy. The institute was approved by the All India Council for Technical Education (AICTE), New Delhi, India. With 39 years of academic excellence, the students of NEC shine far and wide in the world. Today it offers seven undergraduate degree programmes and five post-graduate degree programmes in Engineering and Technology. The institution runs under the National Educational Charitable Trust, founded by the chairman.

Location 
The college is located in Kovilpatti, one of the southern districts of Tamil Nadu. It's situated close to National Highway 44 (India), the longest-running, major north-south National Highway that runs from Srinagar to Kanyakumari. The nearest railway station is in Kovilpatti. Thoothukudi Airport is possibly the closest commercial, and domestic airport, while Madurai Airport is the closest international airport. V. O. Chidambaranar Port Authority is the closest major port.

Courses offered

Ranking and accreditations

NEC is ranked 169 in the National Institutional Ranking Framework (NIRF), 2022.

All the eligible courses are accredited by the National Board of Accreditation (NBA)-Tier I.

It is accredited with "A" grade by National Assessment and Accreditation Council (NAAC) for 5 years from 2022.

Furthermore, the institution is ranked platinum by AICTE Confederation of Indian Industry (CII) and secured 4.5* in the Institution Innovation Council (IIC) rating.

Academics 
The curriculum and syllabus are designed based on the current developments in engineering and technology. NEC has its own learning management system (LMS), which effectively facilitates the teaching-learning process. To instill innovative culture among students, project-based learning is being practiced.

Research 
National Engineering College (NEC) has a well-defined policy to promote research, consultancy, and IPR. NEC has research centers recognized by Anna University to carry out Ph.D. Institution Research Fellowship Scheme is implemented for full-time PhD Scholars. To date, 34 Funded projects worth Rs.5 crores granted by various research boards have been completed successfully. 4 projects worth Rs.1.5 crores are going on. 1500+ Publications are successfully published, and 50+ Patents are successfully filed to date.

Department of Electronics & Communication Engineering 
The department was established in 1984. It offers courses in B.E. (Electronics and Communication Engineering) and M.E. (Embedded Systems Technologies). Dr. R. Parthasarathy, a retired Professor of Indian Institute of Technology Madras or IIT, Chennai and Dr. V. Krishnamurthi, a retired Professor and HOD of College of Engineering, Guindy, has worked for a short period of time during the 1980s and 1990s as Head of the Department. Also, Prof. Ct. Rm. Chidambaram, a retired Professor from Annamalai University, worked for a few years in the mid 1990s.

Student's Life 
NEC campus is a student-friendly campus where the students can have a flexible learning environment. There are separate hostel facilities for both boys and girls with a suitable learning ambience. Students experience a hygienic environment. Students enjoy excellent library facilities with a humungous volume of books, journals, and e-resources.

           They can afford the Wi-Fi facility 24X7 in the college and hostel. Students can transfer the credits by taking online courses in NPTEL, which provide ample space to involve them in other fruitful activities like mini projects, product development, and promotion of entrepreneurial skills. Irrespective of the branches, effective training is provided for students willing to get placement in core or software companies.

Innovation Ecosystem 
National Engineering College (NEC) established a business incubator (NEC-BI) in 2015. NEC BI is recognized by the Ministry of MSME, New Delhi, and is devoted to all the innovators and entrepreneurs emerging from south India. The incubator is a central hub for creating technology start-ups for 80+ technical institutes within 100 km of our venue. Further, it has also established K.R. Innovation Centre (KRIC), a section 8 company, in 2018 to support business Incubation activities in our institution. National Engineering College allocates 1% of its total annual budget to accelerate the activities to support Incubation in addition to the CSR funds worth Rs 10,00,000/- per year)

References 

Engineering colleges in Tamil Nadu